The 1971 Philadelphia Eagles season was their 39th in the National Football League. They improved on their previous output of 3–10–1, winning six games. Despite the improvement, the team failed to qualify for the playoffs for the eleventh consecutive season. This was the team's inaugural season in Veterans Stadium.

After the Eagles lost their first three games of the season, head coach Jerry Williams was fired and replaced by Ed Khayat.

Offseason

NFL Draft 

The table shows the Eagles' selections and what picks they had that were traded away and the team that ended up with that pick. It is possible the Eagles' pick ended up with this team via another team that the Eagles made a trade with.
Not shown are acquired picks that the Eagles traded away.

Roster

Schedule 

Note: Intra-division opponents are in bold text.

Standings

Awards and honors 
Records Breakers
 Al Nelson 102 yard missed field goal return, Eagles vs Dallas on September 26, 1971
Pro Bowl
 Bill Bradley named Pro Bowl starter

League Leaders
 Bill Bradley leads league with 11 interceptions.

External links 
 
 VIDEO: 1971 Week 1, Eagles at Cincinnati Bengals by NFL Films at YouTube
 VIDEO: 1971 Week 4, Minnesota Vikings at Eagles by NFL Films at YouTube

References 

Philadelphia Eagles seasons
Philadelphia Eagles
Philadel